Polypoetes villiodes is a moth of the family Notodontidae. It is found in Colombia.

It is the largest species in the genus Polypoetes with a forewing length of 20.5–22 mm.

References

Moths described in 1918
Notodontidae of South America